It's a Wrap may refer to:

"It's a Wrap" (Mary J. Blige song), 2004
"It's a Wrap" (Mariah Carey song), 2009
"It's a Wrap", a song by Zara Larsson from Introducing (EP) (2013)
"It's a Wrap", a song by Kurupt from Against the Grain (2005)